Ménil-sur-Belvitte is a commune in the Vosges department in Grand Est in northeastern France.

Inhabitants are called Ménilois.

Geography
The Belvitte which flows through the village is a tributary to the Mortagne, which itself flows into the Meurthe.

Personalities
The distinguished organist Gaston Litaize 1901 - 1991 was born at Ménil-sur-Belvitte.

See also
Communes of the Vosges department

References

Communes of Vosges (department)